Urtatagai conflict may refer to:

Urtatagai conflict (1913)
Urtatagai conflict (1925–1926)